Pedro Carmona is a member of the Institutional Revolutionary Party who was mayor of the district (colonia) of Felipe Carrillo Puerto in the municipality of Santa Lucía del Camino in the Mexican state of Oaxaca.

A local news organization, Centros Medios Libres, alleged that Pedro Carmona was the person who fatally shot Indymedia journalist Brad Will on October 27, 2006 during the teachers' strike in Oaxaca.

References

External links
 Alleged photo of Pedro Carmona before he allegedly killed Brad Will

People from Oaxaca
Living people
Year of birth missing (living people)